V-sub x, also known as GD-7, is an organophosphate nerve agent of the V-series, the phosphonate analog of the organophosphate insecticide demeton. EA-5478 is the pinacolyl analogue.

See also
VX (nerve agent)
Demeton

References

V-series nerve agents
Phosphonothioates
Acetylcholinesterase inhibitors
Ethyl esters
Thioethers